Cas may refer to:

 Caș, a type of cheese made in Romania
  (1886–) Czech magazine associated with Tomáš Garrigue Masaryk
 Čas (19 April 1945–February 1948), the official, daily newspaper of the Democratic Party of Slovakia
 CAS, a 2018 album by Lúnasa, an Irish Celtic band
 Cas (people), an ancient people near the Caspian Sea
 Cas (name), a list of people (and a mythological hero) with the given name, nickname or surname
 Cas guava (Psidium friedrichsthalianum), a Costa Rican guava species
 Cas Cay, an island in St. Thomas, United States Virgin Islands
 Cassiopeia (constellation), standard astronomical abbreviation
 Cas9, a CRISPR associated protein
 Castleford, town in West Yorkshire know colloquially as Cas